William McKinnon Fetzer (June 24, 1884 – May 3, 1959) was an American football, basketball, and baseball coach. He served as the head football coach at Davidson College (1915–1918), North Carolina State University (1919–1920), and the University of North Carolina at Chapel Hill (1921–1925), compiling a career college football record of 61–28–7. His brother, Bob Fetzer, served as co-head football coach at the University of North Carolina and later became the first and longest serving Athletics Director for the university. Fetzer also was the head basketball coach at Davidson for two seasons, from 1916 to 1918, tallying a mark of 18–11. In addition, he coached baseball at Davidson (1915–1919), NC State (1920), and North Carolina (1921–1925), amassing a career college baseball record of 128–75–5.

Baseball career
Fetzer was also a professional baseball player. He made his Major League Baseball (MLB) debut on September 4, 1906 as a pinch hitter for the Philadelphia Athletics. In his lone at bat Fetzer failed to record a hit. This would be his only major league game, although he continued to play in the minor leagues, primarily as an outfielder, until 1910. He threw with his left hand and hit with his right. Prior to his professional career, Fetzer played collegiately at Davidson College.

Head coaching record

Football

References

External links
 
 

1884 births
1959 deaths
Baseball outfielders
Danville Red Sox players
Davidson Wildcats baseball coaches
Davidson Wildcats baseball players
Davidson Wildcats football coaches
Davidson Wildcats men's basketball coaches
Des Moines Boosters players
NC State Wolfpack baseball coaches
NC State Wolfpack football coaches
Norfolk Tars players
North Carolina Tar Heels baseball coaches
North Carolina Tar Heels football coaches
Philadelphia Athletics players
Winston-Salem Twins players
People from Concord, North Carolina
Baseball players from North Carolina
Basketball coaches from North Carolina